Ethirneechal is a 2022 Indian-Tamil language drama television series starring Madhumitha, Kaniha, Priyadarshini and Haripriya in lead roles. The show is produced by Sun Entertainment and Thiruselvam Theatres and written and directed by V. Thiruselvam, which premiered on 8 February 2022 in Sun TV and digitally streams on Sun NXT.

Synopsis 
The story involves Janani, a high achiever and her three co-sisters Eshwari, Renuka and Nandhini who are well educated graduates, while all of their husbands aren't educated at all. Their husbands don't like them getting a job; they want their wives to be housekeepers.

Janani married Sakthivel, the youngest brother of Aadhi family; he is honest and submissive in nature. Janani raises voice against the male chauvinism in the Gunasekaran's house. Sakthi assured his support to Janani in all situations.

Suddenly, Sakthi started to turn against Janani (because of the emotional blackmail of his eldest brother Gunasekaran) and also doubted her character (based on her genuine friendship with Gowtham). Finally, Janani broke up her relationship with Sakthi and left Gunasekaran's house to start a new independent life. But after listening the advice of Pattammal (Gunasekaran's grandmother), Janani comes back to Gunasekaran's house to help her co-sisters to be independent. Sakthi started to realise his mistake and Janani accepted him as a good friend.

Plot
Nachiappan and Parvati married against their parents' wishes. In a few years, their daughter, Janani, was born. They live as a joint family with Parvathi's brother Tiruvengadam and his wife, Padmavathy, who have two children of their own.

Nachiappan rears Janani to focus on studies above all else, and dreams of a successful future for her. While inherently good natured, he can be stubborn and domineering. His controlling nature extends to her clothes, and her choice of friends. 

Aadhimuthu Gunasekaran, a business tycoon from Madurai, approaches the family with a wedding proposal to Janani for his brother Sakthivel. What Janani's family don't know is that the other daughters-in-law of the household are treated badly. They are not allowed to work, even though they are well educated. They are regularly put down by Gunasekaran's family due to their humble backgrounds and not consulted on decisions, even regarding their children.

Nachiappan is entranced by their wealth and believes the lie Gunasekaran has told him-namely, that he will appoint Janani as an MD in one of his companies. Despite warnings from her cousin, and other red flags, Janani marries Sakthivel. While Sakthivel is good natured, he lacks the courage to face up to his family's ill-treatment of women.

As time goes by, Janani and her family come to know the truth. How Janani faces her domineering in-laws and leads change forms the crux of the story with the help of Pattammal, Gunasekaran’s grandmother (who have 40% share in the assets of Gunasekaran).

Cast

Main Cast 
 Madhumitha H as Janani Shakthivel
 Kaniha as Eswari Gunasekaran
 Priyadharshini Neelakandan as Renuka Gnanasekaran
 Haripriya Isai as Nandhini Kathirvel

Additional Cast 
 G. Marimuthu as Aadhimuthu Gunasekaran alias Gunasekara: Eshwari's husband 
 Sabari Prasanth as Aadhimuthu Shakthivel alias Shakthi: Janani's husband
 Kamalesh PK as Aadhimuthu Gnanasekaran alias Gnanam: Renuka's husband 
 Vibhu Raman as Aadhimuthu Kathirvel alias Kathir: Nandhini's husband
 Sathya Devarajan as Aadhiraiselvi alias Aadhira Arun: Gunasekaran, Gnanasekaran, Kathirvel, Shakthivel's sister, Arun's love interest and would-be wife
 Sathyapriya as Visalatchi: Gunasekaran, Gnanasekaran, Kathirvel, Shakthivel and Aathiraiselvi's mother
 Bombay Gnanam as Pattamal: Gunasekaran, Gnanasekaran, Kathirvel, Shakthivel and Aathiraiselvi's grandmother 
 Monisha Vijay as Priyadharshini Gunasekaran: Eshwari's daughter
 Rithik Raghavendra as Priyadharshan Gunasekaran: Eshwari's son
 Aishwarya Rathinam as Aishwarya Gnanasekaran: Renuka's daughter
 Farzana Ansari as Thara Kathirvel: Nandhini's daughter
 Vaishnavi Nayak as Nivashini "Vasu" Thiruvengadam: Janani's cousin
 Som Soumyan as Nachiyappan: Janani's father
 Keerthana as Parvathi Nachiyappan: Janani's mother
 VJ Thara as Anjana Nachiyappan: Janani's younger sister
 Vasavi as Padhmavathi Thiruvengadam: Janani's aunt, Vasu and Sriram's mother
 Balaji as Thiruvengadam: Janani's uncle, Vasu and Sriram's father
 Subramanian Gopalakrishnan as Sriram Thiruvengadam: Janani's cousin 
 Vimalkumar J as Karikalan alias Karikala Ramalingam: Aadhimuthu family's relative who one-sidedly loves Aadhirai
 Gaayathri Krishnan as Jhansi Rani: Karikalan's mother 
 Goudham Krishnan as Gowtham: Janani's best friend
 Vasudevan Venugopal as Rajavarman Subramaniam Krishnamoorthy (SKR): Gunasekaran’s business rival. 
 Radhika Vairavelavan as Charubala Rajavarman: SKR’s wife and Gunasekaran’s ex-love interest
 Chaanakyaa as Arunkumar Subramaniam Krishnamoorthy (SKR): SKR's second younger brother and Aathirai’s love interest
 Giri Dwarakish as Arasu Subramaniam Krishnamoorthy: SKR's younger brother
 Bharathi Kannan as Kovai Subaiah: Visalatch's younger brother
 Vishnu Vasudev as Sethuraman: Eshwari's father 
 Apollo Ravi as Kadambavanam: Gunasekaran's sidekick 
 Archana as Rani: Aadhimuthu Family's house maid
 Sabarish Selvaraj as Kumar: Arasu's sidekick
 Madhu Karthik as Karthikeyan Subramaniam Krishnamoorthy (SKR): SKR's last brother
 Anbarasi as Anbarasi: Janani's office mate
 Jillu Vikram as Vikram: Janani's friend
 Abinaya as Kathija: Janani's friend
 Merwen Balaji as Kedhar: Janani's friend
 Sudha Pushpa as Savithri Sethuraman: Eshwari's mother (deceased)

Special Appearances 
 Hemadayal as Kundavai Duraisaami: Shakthivel's ex-fiance
 Prashanth as young Eshwari's love interest
 Bhavana as young Eshwari
 Shakthi Dayalan as Shakthi
 Jayashree as Jayashree Chandrasekhar

Production

Development 
On September end 2021, Sun Network confirmed through a press release that it would distribute new Tamil serial, to be produced by Sun Entertainment and Thiruselvam theatres and written and directed by Thiruselvam is a daily soap after a long pause.

Casting 
Kannada and Telugu actress Madhumitha was cast in the female lead role as Janani. Tamil film actress Kaniha was cast as the main role, who making her come back after 14 years in Tamil television series. Priyadarshini and Haripriya were cast as the next main leads. Bombay Gnanam, was cast as supporting role, who making her comeback after 10 years.

Actor Sabari Prasanth was selected for a pivotal role. While Keerthana, Kamalesh, Merwen, Goutham K S, Maarimuthu, Vibhu Raman and Sathyapriya were also selected for supporting roles.

Soundtrack 
It was written by Balachandran.DD, composed by Srinivas. It was sung by Sharanya Srinivas and Srinidhi. The first opening song was unveiled on 1 February 2022 on Sun TV YouTube.

Soundtrack

Adaptations

References

External links 
 

Sun TV original programming
Tamil-language melodrama television series
2022 Tamil-language television series debuts
Television shows set in Tamil Nadu
Tamil-language television soap operas
Tamil-language television shows